The Sarasota Herald Building is a historic structure located at 539 South Orange Avenue in Sarasota, Florida. The building served as the headquarters for Sarasota Herald-Tribune from 1925 to 1969.

History
The structure was built by Owen Burns. On March 22, 1984, it was added to the U.S. National Register of Historic Places. In 1969, the Sarasota Woman's Exchange moved in after purchasing and renovating the building. More renovations were carried out in 1982.

Gallery

References

External links
 Woman's Exchange official site

National Register of Historic Places in Sarasota County, Florida
Buildings and structures in Sarasota, Florida
Newspaper headquarters in the United States